Clarkson College is a private college in Omaha, Nebraska focused on the health sciences. The institution was founded in 1888 by Meliora Clarkson following the death of her husband Bishop Robert Clarkson of the Episcopal Church. It is affiliated with Nebraska Medicine. Total student enrollment was 1,178 in fall 2018.

History
In 1869, the Omaha Good Samaritan Hospital opened in Omaha, Nebraska, and seven months later, the hospital was transferred to the care of Bishop Clarkson. After his death in 1884, his wife, Meliora, worked with deaconesses of the Trinity Episcopal Cathedral to establish a training school for nurses within the hospital. The Bishop Clarkson Memorial School of Nursing was established in 1888 as the first training school for nurses in the state of Nebraska with its first class graduating in 1890. In 1902, the Bishop Clarkson Memorial School of Nursing began offering a three-year program, which it maintained for the first half of the twentieth century.

After briefly closing in the 1950s due to budget concerns, the school reopened following a donation from Peter and Evelyn Kiewitt. In 1982, the school changed its name to Bishop Clarkson College and began offering its first four-year degree option: a bachelor's degree in nursing. In 1987, the institution appointed Patricia Book Perry as its first president and established its first board of directors. The institution expanded its health care education offerings in the early 1990s and changed its name to Clarkson College in 1992. Today, the school offers undergraduate, graduate and certificate programs in the health sciences.

Academics 
Clarkson College is accredited by the Higher Learning Commission and offers certificate, undergraduate, graduate, and post-graduate options in healthcare fields.

References

External links 
 Official website

Education in Omaha, Nebraska
Private universities and colleges in Nebraska
Educational institutions established in 1888
Buildings and structures in Omaha, Nebraska
Universities and colleges affiliated with the Episcopal Church (United States)
1888 establishments in Nebraska
Universities and colleges accredited by the Higher Learning Commission